Cephalerpeton is an extinct genus of "protorothyridid" eureptile known from the Late Carboniferous (late Westphalian stage) of Illinois.

It is known from the holotype YPM 796, a partial skeleton. It was collected in the Mazon Creek site, from the Francis Creek Shale Member of the Carbondale Formation. It was first named by R. L. Moodie in 1912 as an amphibamid amphibian and the type species is Cephalerpeton ventriarmatum. It was first assigned to Protorothyrididae by Robert L. Carroll and Donald Baird in 1972 and this placement has been widely accepted.

References

Prehistoric romeriids
Fossil taxa described in 1912
Carboniferous reptiles of North America
Prehistoric reptile genera